Serine/threonine-protein kinase MARK2 is an enzyme that in humans is encoded by the MARK2 gene.

Function 

EMK (ELKL Motif Kinase) is a small family of ser/thr protein kinases involved in the control of cell polarity, microtubule stability and cancer. Several cDNA clones have been isolated that encoded two isoforms of the human ser/thr protein kinase EMK1. These isoforms were characterized by the presence of a 162-bp alternative exon that gave rise to two forms, one containing the exon and the other one lacking it. Both forms were found to be coexpressed in a number of selected cell lines and tissue samples. The human EMK1 was shown to be encoded by a single mRNA ubiquitously expressed.

Interactions 

MARK2 has been shown to interact with AKT1.

References

Further reading 

 
 
 
 
 
 
 
 
 
 
 
 
 
 
 
 

EC 2.7.11